Deddeh, Deddé,  is a village in the Koura District of Lebanon. It is located 295 metres above sea level and has an area of  The villagers are  Greek Orthodox Christian  and  Sunni Muslim. There are 3993 residents in Deddeh.  In the last municipal elections of 2004, Deddeh counted 5457 registered voters of which 3444 actually voted.

References

Populated places in the North Governorate
Koura District
Eastern Orthodox Christian communities in Lebanon
Sunni Muslim communities in Lebanon